Harold Palmer Howard (November 24, 1866 – March 1, 1951) was a brigadier general in the United States Army during World War I.

Education and military career 
He attended the United States Military Academy and graduated in 1891.  On February 2, 1901, he was appointed to the rank of captain and served with the 14th Cavalry.  This was followed by a tour as quartermaster at Fort Keogh, Montana, in charge of the Remount Depot from June 24, 1909, to December 1912.

Before World War I, Howard participated in the Spanish–American War and the Philippine insurrection. His Silver Star citations are from his service there.  During World War I, he commanded the 82nd Field Artillery and 17th Field Artillery Brigade.

He retired as a colonel in 1920, but his rank of brigadier general was restored by act of Congress in June 1930.

After serving in the U.S Army, Howard was a professor of Military Sciences and Tactics at St. Thomas College in St. Paul, Minneapolis.

Civilian career 
Howard was later employed by the Federal Serve Bank in Minneapolis.

References

Bibliography 

1866 births
1951 deaths
University of St. Thomas (Minnesota) faculty
United States Army generals
United States Military Academy alumni
Recipients of the Silver Star
United States Army generals of World War I
American military personnel of the Spanish–American War
American military personnel of the Philippine–American War